Grandstand is a tennis stadium situated in the USTA Billie Jean King National Tennis Center, in Flushing Meadows–Corona Park, Queens, New York. The stadium which has a capacity to seat 8,125 people, is owned by the United States Tennis Association. The court is the third largest at the national tennis center, after the Arthur Ashe and Louis Armstrong Stadiums. Built to host the US Open, Grandstand was constructed as part of a redesign of the national tennis center and is the first Leadership in Energy and Environmental Design tennis stadium in the world. The stadium designed by Rossetti Architects and constructed by AECOM is named after a 1978 stadium of the same name.

History

Grandstand replaced a court with the same name that was attached to the Louis Armstrong Stadium which opened in 1978 and was decommissioned in 2016. The court was built as part of the USTA's $550m (£350m) scheme to renovate the National Tennis Center which was announced in August 2013 after obtaining planning permission in May of that year. The stadium was designed by Rossetti Architects and has a capacity of 8,125 seats and covers an area of 125,000 square foot. In addition it has 2,000 reserved ticketed seats in the lower bowl, with the rest being allocated on a first come first served basis. Construction of the court by AECOM began in 2015. Approximately 30 percent of the steel structure was in place by the time of the 2015 US Open. Four days after the tournament construction recommenced and the last steel piece was installed in December 2015. The court made its debut on August 29, 2016, the first day of the 2016 championships. Caroline Wozniacki beat Taylor Townsend 4–6, 6–3, 6–4 in the first match held on the court.

Architecture
The stadium is situated in the Southwest corner of the National Tennis Center to help alleviate crowd issues and to distribute people more evenly. An estimated 20% of visitors to the site had been relocated due to the change. The tennis center was increased by 30 feet to have enough room to construct the new Grandstand court, however the USTA gave 1.56 acres of land back to compensate. The court itself was built on an old parking lot. 

The court has 16 sides and rises higher on the southwest corner and lower in the northeast corner. This design offers view of the grounds on the upper walkways and spectators in Arthur Ashe stadium are able to look into Grandstand. Although the court has 16 sides it looks round which is deliberate to create a diversity of shapes of the stadiums on the site. It was made clear to the design team that spectators loved the intimacy and the shade of the old Grandstand and these features were incorporated into the design; with more seats in the stadium positioned in shady spots. The court is 18 feet below ground level. Due to its closeness to Flushing Meadows, the stadium was built with texture designed to be an "interesting folly" to patrons in the park. The outside of the stadium is made up by 400 panels of PTFE fabric to achieve this effect. Grandstand also contains a large retail store facing the main plaza and has several food vendors within its 360 degree concourse.

Grandstand is the first Leadership in Energy and Environmental Design tennis stadium in the world. The stadium claimed the NYCxDesign Award in the Outdoor/Urban Landscape category. The stadium also received an honourable mention in The Architect's Newspaper Best of Design Award in Facade.

Transport
The New York City Subway and Long Island Rail Road both serve the northern end of Flushing Meadows Park, the location of the tennis centre in which Grandstand is situated. These stations are located at the northern end of the park adjacent to the Corona Yard and bus depot, primarily serving Citi Field and the national tennis centre. The  bus from Flushing to La Guardia Airport serves the tennis centre.

References

External links
 
 Rossetti

Tennis venues in New York City
Sports venues in Queens, New York
US Open (tennis)
Sports venues completed in 2016
Flushing Meadows–Corona Park
2016 establishments in New York City